Red Right Hand is an upcoming American action thriller film directed by Ian Nelms and Eshom Nelms and starring Orlando Bloom and Andie MacDowell.

Cast
Orlando Bloom as Cash
Andie MacDowell as Queenpin Big Cat
Scott Haze as Finney
Garret Dillahunt as Wilder
Mo McRae as Deputy Duke Parks
Brian Geraghty as Sheriff Hollister
Chapel Oaks as Savannah
Kenneth Miller as The Buck
Nicholas Logan as The Doe

Production
Filming occurred in April 2022 in Campbellsburg, Shepherdsville, and New Castle, Kentucky.

In May 2022, it was announced that Redbox Entertainment will distribute the film in the United States.

References

External links
 

Upcoming films
American action thriller films
Films produced by Basil Iwanyk
Films shot in Kentucky
Upcoming English-language films